The Welsh Music Prize is an annual music prize awarded for the best album from Wales, as voted for by members of the music industry. It was founded by music promoter John Rostron and radio presenter Huw Stephens in 2011. It was originally scheduled to take place alongside Sŵn music festival in Cardiff but now takes place later in the year.

Winners and shortlisted nominees

Most-nominated artists

References

External links

Welsh music
Welsh music awards
British music awards
Awards established in 2011
2011 establishments in Wales